North East Reef is a reef in the Wallabi Group of the Houtman Abrolhos, in the Indian Ocean off the coast of Western Australia. The island is part of the Houtman Abrolhos Important Bird Area, identified as such by BirdLife International because of its importance for supporting large numbers of breeding seabirds.

See also
 List of reefs

References

Wallabi Group
Reefs of the Indian Ocean
Important Bird Areas of Western Australia